Die ersten Menschen (The first humans) is an opera in two acts by Rudi Stephan. For the libretto the composer chose poetry of the same name by Otto Borngräber. The opera was premiered at the Oper Frankfurt on 1 July 1920.

History 
The poet Otto Borngräber wrote Die ersten Menschen, subtitled "Erotisches Mysterium" (Erotic mystery) in 1908. The play is based on the characters from the biblical Genesis creation narrative. When it was premiered in Munich in 1912, it caused a scandal and was banned in the Kingdom of Bavaria.
 
Rudi Stephan set the text to music as an opera in two acts. He began in 1909 and completed it in 1914, shortly before World War I. The premiere was planned at the Oper Frankfurt for the winter 1915; however, by then the composer had died at the Eastern Front.

The opera was finally premiered on 1 July 1920, conducted by Ludwig Rottenberg. The critics received the performance positively, but the audience less so, leading to few performances.

Karl Holl (1892–1972) made a shortened version, cutting objectionable passages. It was played at the Theater Münster on 17 November 1924. The opera was neglected from the 1950s, and revived in the late 1980s. The original score was played almost unchanged in a concert performance at the Konzerthaus Berlin, by the Rundfunk-Sinfonieorchester Berlin conducted by Karl Anton Rickenbacher. It was recorded with soloists Siegmund Nimsgern as Adahm,  as Chawa, Florian Cerny as Kajin, and Hans Aschenbach as Chabel.

Another performance of the original version was performed on 24 November 2009 at the Freiburg Konzerthaus, with Fabrice Bollon conducting the Philharmonisches Orchester Freiburg. On 3 June 2021, François-Xavier Roth conducted the Royal Concertgebouw Orchestra in a stage production of Stopera in Amsterdam, directed by Calixto Bieito.

Plot
The opera takes place after the expulsion from paradise according to the Genesis creation narrative. The scene is a landscape in spring.

The libretto can be described as psychological poetry. The opera deals with the matrimonial conflict between Adahm (Adam) and Chawa (Eve) and the sexual intrigues between the sons Kajin (Cain) and Chabel (Abel), who both desire the only woman available, their mother.

Roles

Recordings 
 , Siegmund Nimsgern, Florian Cerny, Hans Aschenbach, Berlin Radio Symphony Orchestra conducted by Karl Anton Rickenbacher, cpo 1998 
 Nancy Gustafson, Donnie Ray Albert, Orchestre National de France conducted by Mikko Franck, Naïve

References

External links 
 SWR2 Oper, Rudi Stephan: Die ersten Menschen
 

1920 operas
Cultural depictions of Adam and Eve
German-language operas
Operas
Operas based on the Bible